Haarsh Limbachiya (born 30 January 1987) is an Indian screenwriter, producer and television host. He has written for the shows Comedy Circus Ke Tansen, Comedy Nights Bachao and Comedy Nights Live. He also wrote dialogues for the film PM Narendra Modi and lyrics for the title-track of the film Malang. He has created, produced and hosted television shows like Khatra Khatra Khatra and Hum Tum Aur Quarantine along with his wife Bharti Singh.

Personal life 

Haarsh married comedienne Bharti Singh on 3 December in 2017. In the same year, he founded his production company- H3 Productions.

On 22 November 2020, the NCB arrested Haarsh Limbachiyaa and his wife Bharti Singh after a search was conducted in which 86.5 gms of Marijuana was found and seized. He was later arrested after 15 hours of questioning by anti-drugs agency NCB. He was granted bail after 2 days of interrogation on 23 November 2020. 

On 3 April 2022, Haarsh and his wife Bharti were blessed with a boy whom they named Lakshya(Nickname-Gola).

Filmography

Films

Television

References

External links

Living people
Participants in Indian reality television series
1987 births
Indian stand-up comedians
Fear Factor: Khatron Ke Khiladi participants